Conus gonsaloi is a species of sea snail, a marine gastropod mollusc in the family Conidae, the cone snails, cone shells or cones.

These snails are predatory and venomous. They are capable of "stinging" humans.

Description

Distribution
This marine species in the Atlantic Ocean off the Cape Verdes.

References

 Cossignani T. & Fiadeiro R. (2014). Cinque nuovi coni da Capo Verde. Malacologia Mostra Mondiale. 84: 21- 27 page(s): 25
 Puillandre N., Duda T.F., Meyer C., Olivera B.M. & Bouchet P. (2015). One, four or 100 genera? A new classification of the cone snails. Journal of Molluscan Studies. 81: 1-23

External links
 Register of Marine Species
 

gonsaloi
Gastropods described in 2014